John Heard Jr. (March 7, 1946 – July 21, 2017) was an American actor. Heard made his debut appearance in film with the ensemble Between the Lines (1977). He appeared in a number of successful films, including Heart Beat (1980), Cutter's Way (1981), Cat People (1982), Beaches (1988), and Deceived (1991). Other films include The Trip to Bountiful (1985), Big (1988), The Pelican Brief (1993), White Chicks (2004), and his role as Kevin McCallister's father, Peter, in Home Alone (1990) and Home Alone 2: Lost in New York (1992). From 1995 to 1996, he played the role of Roy Foltrigg in the television series The Client. From 2005 to 2006, Heard played the role of Governor Frank Tancredi in Prison Break. He was nominated for an Emmy Award in 1999 for guest-starring as Vin Makazian on The Sopranos (1999–2004).

Early life and education
Heard was born on March 7, 1946, in Washington, D.C. a son of Helen ( Sperling), who was involved in the arts and appeared in community theatre, and John Heard, who worked for the office of the Secretary of Defense. He was raised as a Roman Catholic, and attended Gonzaga College High School, Clark University (in Worcester, Massachusetts), and Catholic University of America. He grew up with two sisters, Lise and Cordis (an actress), and a brother, the late Matthew Heard, who predeceased his mother and brother.

Acting career
In the 1970s, Heard appeared on the stage and in television and film. He appeared off-Broadway in 1974 in Mark Medoff's play The Wager and in 1975 as Guildenstern in Hamlet at the Delacorte Theatre in Central Park, where he also understudied Sam Waterston as Hamlet. That fall, the production moved to the Vivian Beaumont Theater at Lincoln Center. Heard appeared at the Eugene O'Neill Theater Center in 1977 in a series of new plays. Heard won Obie Awards for his performances in Othello and Split in 1979–80. He was the male lead in the 1979 film Head Over Heels (which was renamed and re-released as Chilly Scenes of Winter in 1982).

In 1981, he had the starring role of Alex Cutter in the film Cutter's Way. In 1982, he played the lover of Nastassja Kinski, one of the main characters, in the remake of Cat People. He co-starred as photographer George Cooper in C.H.U.D. (Cannibalistic Humanoid Underground Dwellers, 1984) alongside future Home Alone co-star Daniel Stern and in The Trip to Bountiful (1985). In the comedy-drama film Heaven Help Us (aka, Catholic Boys, 1985), Heard played a monk named Brother Timothy. In After Hours (also 1985), Heard was bartender Tom Schorr.

He was seen in the film The Milagro Beanfield War and had a significant role playing Paul, Tom Hanks's adult corporate competitor and jilted boyfriend of Elizabeth Perkins, in Big (both 1988). He co-starred with Bette Midler in Beaches (also 1988). In 1990 Heard starred in the philosophical film Mindwalk, in which three characters from different sociopolitical and cultural backgrounds express their opinions on the human experience, and around the same time, he was in Awakenings alongside Robert De Niro and Robin Williams, starred in Deceived (1991), with Goldie Hawn, playing Jack Saunders, and had a supporting role in Gladiator (1992), with Cuba Gooding Jr.

He played Daugherty in the film Radio Flyer (1992) and FBI agent Gavin Vereek in The Pelican Brief (1993). He starred with Samuel L. Jackson in 1997's One Eight Seven and was featured in the 2000 miniseries Perfect Murder, Perfect Town.

Home Alone and sequel
In 1990, Heard starred as Peter McCallister in the comedy Home Alone. He played the part of Kevin's (played by Macaulay Caulkin) father who unwittingly leaves his son at home when making a Christmas trip to France. Heard chose to characterize the role with a combination of concerned dramatic acting of a father missing his son along with more classical comedic tropes. The film was one of the biggest hits of 1990, and Heard reprised the role of McCallister in the sequel Home Alone 2: Lost in New York.

Television work
Heard featured in a television production of The Scarlet Letter (1979) as Arthur Dimmesdale. He played real-life Ku Klux Klan leader D. C. Stephenson in the TV miniseries Cross of Fire (1989) and played the part of David Manning in the ABC miniseries adaptation of Shirley MacLaine's Out on a Limb, a memoir of her journey toward acceptance of spiritual and extraterrestrial realities. Heard also had roles on The Sopranos as the troubled corrupt detective Vin Makazian for which he received an Emmy nomination as outstanding guest actor; as well as Mr. Detrolio, father of Finn Detrolio, one of Meadows' boyfriends, and later on Battlestar Galactica as Commander Barry Garner.

He had recurring roles on CSI: Miami (as Kenwall Duquesne, father of Calleigh Duquesne) and Prison Break (as Frank Tancredi, governor of Illinois and father of Sara Tancredi). Among other film and television roles in the 2000s and 2010s, he played the mayor of Chicago on two episodes of the Fox series The Chicago Code.

Legacy
In 2008, Heard was asked about his career and he replied,

Personal life
Heard married actress Margot Kidder in 1979, but the marriage was dissolved after only six days.

In 1987, he had a son, John Matthew Heard, with actress and former girlfriend Melissa Leo. Heard was arrested in 1991 and charged with third-degree assault for allegedly slapping Leo. In 1997, he was found guilty of trespassing at Leo's home but was acquitted of charges of trespassing at their son's school.

By his marriage to Sharon Heard, he had two children, Annika Rose and Maxwell John. Maxwell died on December 6, 2016, aged 22.

On May 24, 2010, Heard married, lastly, Lana Pritchard in Los Angeles. The couple divorced seven months later.

Death

Heard died from cardiac arrest due to atherosclerotic and hypertensive heart disease on July 21, 2017, at the age of 71. His body was found by staff in a hotel in Palo Alto, California, where he was reportedly recovering after minor back surgery at Stanford University Hospital. The back surgery did not play a role in his death. His cause of death was confirmed by the Santa Clara County Medical Examiner's office.  He was buried in South Side Cemetery in Ipswich, Massachusetts.

Awards and honors
Source unless otherwise noted:
 1977 Theatre World Award for his performance in G.R. Point
 1976–77 Obie Award, Best Performance, G.R. Point
 1979–80 Obie Award, Best Performance, Othello and Split
 1999 Emmy Award nomination, Outstanding Guest Actor in a Drama Series (1999)

In 2003, he was inducted into the Gonzaga College High School Theatre Hall of Fame.

Filmography

Television

References

External links
 
 
 
 
 

1946 births
2017 deaths
20th-century American male actors
21st-century American male actors
American male film actors
American male stage actors
American male television actors
American male voice actors
Catholic University of America alumni
Clark University alumni
Gonzaga College High School alumni
Male actors from Washington, D.C.